The Citroën Karin was a concept car presented at the Paris Motor Show in 1980. It featured a striking, pyramidal design and was designed by Trevor Fiore. The exterior of the car incorporated flush glass panels, faired rear wheels, and butterfly doors. The roof of the Karin was only the size of an A3 sheet of paper due to its truncated pyramid shape. One of the Karin's most noticeable interior features was the unconventional three-seat layout with the driver located in the middle of the two passengers.

References

External links 
Photos of Citroën Karin Concept Car (1980)
Karin - a reverie

Karin
Cars with a centre driving position